Mill Run is a ghost town in Pocahontas County, West Virginia, United States. Mill Run appeared on USGS maps as late as 1923.

References

Geography of Pocahontas County, West Virginia
Ghost towns in West Virginia